The Varman Dynasty or Khmer Dynasty (Khmer: រាជវង្សវរ្ម័ន; The Rhea vong sa Varaman , Roman: Varman Dynasty of Khmer) was the ruling family of the Khmer Empire (Khmer: ព្រះរាជាណាចក្រកម្ពុជា).

History 
The Varman Dynasty was established by King Kaundinyavarmandeva (Khmer: កៅណ្ឌិន្យវរ្ម័នទេវ), who married Queen Soma (Khmer: សោមា), who ruled the indigenous kingdom and established her spouse as the king of the Nokor Phnom or Funan kingdom, forming the Varman dynasty. There is evidence in the Sanskrit stone inscription mentioning that the Brahmin Kaundinya who received the magic spear from the Brahmin Ashwatthama (Sanskrit: अश्वत्थामा, Roman: Aśvatthāmā), the son of Drona (Sanskrit: द्रोण, Roman: Droṇa), had arrived in the kingdom of the Nāga (IAST: nāga; Devanāgarī: नाग) tribe and had finally waged a war and negotiated with them peacefully. Through marriage, Kaundinya Brahmin therefore was established as King Kaundinyavarmandeva (Khmer: កៅណ្ឌិន្យទី១), the first King of the Varman Dynasty.

Zhou Daguan, the Chinese diplomat during the reign Emperor Nian Chengzong of the Nguyen dynasty traveled to Angkor in 1296 to record the traditions and places, including the royal family and court traditions which corresponds to the reign of King Indravarman III (ឥន្ទ្រវរ្ម័នទី៣). Zhou Daquan was not the first Chinese to enter the kingdom but made the most detailed record of the lives of the Angkorians known as Zhenla Feng Tuji (Chenla Tradition Record). This record is an important record about Angkor and the Khmer Empire. In addition to the stone inscriptions and other documents depicting the daily lives of the residents of Angkor. From this record, the order of kings in the Varman dynasty is known in detail, which later became the original version of the Cambodian royal chronicles.

Kings of the Varman dynasty

References

Cambodian monarchs